Planet Hollywood Beach Resort, (stylized as planet hollywood) is a luxury 5 star hotel based in Goa, India inspired by the popular Las Vegas’s casino hotel Planet Hollywood and it was launched in Goa December 2014, it is India's first Hollywood themed Beach Resort in Goa. Sachiin Joshi is the founder and Vice Chairman of this beach resort, who is an Indian film actor, producer and son of JMJ Group owner Jagdish Mohanlal Joshi
.

References

Planet Hollywood Goa launch party, Goa photogallery.indiatimes

Hotels in Goa
Hotels established in 2014
Hotel buildings completed in 2014